Hardy Lucas is a former member of the National Assembly of Seychelles.  He is a member of the Seychelles National Party, and was elected to the Assembly in 2002 and held his position until 2009. He was then a board member of the Public Service Appeals Board 2009 - 2014 and is currently a Commissioner of the Anti Corruption Commission Seychelles (ACCS).

References

Year of birth missing (living people)
Living people
Members of the National Assembly (Seychelles)
Seychelles National Party politicians